Viktor Valentényi (born 14 October 1977) is a Hungarian footballer who plays for Békéscsabai Előre FC as defender.

References
 Futballévkönyv 2003 [Football Yearbook 2003], Volume I, 104–109. o., Aréna 2000 kiadó, Budapest: 2004 

1977 births
Living people
Hungarian footballers
Association football defenders
Békéscsaba 1912 Előre footballers
People from Békéscsaba
Sportspeople from Békés County